S. Subbiah is an Indian politician and former Member of the Legislative Assembly. He was elected to the Tamil Nadu legislative assembly  from Sankaranayanarkoil constituency in 1971 and 1977 elections as a Dravida Munnetra Kazhagam candidate. Former National president of ABVP.

References 

Dravida Munnetra Kazhagam politicians
Members of the Tamil Nadu Legislative Assembly
Year of birth missing
Possibly living people